Utica is a city in the Mohawk Valley and the county seat of Oneida County, New York, United States. The tenth-most-populous city in New York State, its population was 65,283 in the 2020 U.S. Census. Utica and the nearby city of Rome anchor the Utica–Rome Metropolitan Statistical Area comprising all of Oneida and Herkimer Counties.

Formerly a river settlement inhabited by the Mohawk Nation of the Iroquois Confederacy, Utica attracted European-American settlers from New England during and after the American Revolution. In the 19th century, immigrants strengthened its position as a layover city between Albany and Syracuse on the Erie and Chenango Canals and the New York Central Railroad. During the 19th and 20th centuries, the city's infrastructure contributed to its success as a manufacturing center and defined its role as a worldwide hub for the textile industry. Utica's 20th-century political corruption and organized crime gave it the nickname "Sin City".

Like other Rust Belt cities, Utica underwent an economic downturn throughout the mid-20th century. The downturn consisted of industrial decline due to offshoring and the closure of textile mills, population loss caused by the relocation of jobs and businesses to suburbs and to Syracuse, and poverty associated with socioeconomic stress and a depressed tax base. With its low cost of living, the city has become a melting pot for refugees from war-torn countries around the world, encouraging growth for its colleges and universities, cultural institutions and economy.

Etymology
The first Utica was a former city in modern-today Tunisia. Many central New York locations have the names of ancient cities or people (Rome, Syracuse, Ithaca, Troy, Homer, Cicero, Ovid, and a number of others).
 
The reuse of the name of ancient Utica for a modern village, then city, owes a great deal to Classically-trained surveyor Robert Harpur (1731–1825), for many years a professor in King's College (today Columbia University). It was he who gave out the central New York State Classical names, and he stated that he named the village of Utica. However, another theory involves a 1798 meeting at Bagg's Tavern (a resting place for travelers passing through the village) where the name was picked from a hat holding 13 suggestions. How Utica came to be among them, if not due ultimately to Harpur, is unknown.

History

Iroquois natives and colonial settlement

Utica was established on the site of Old Fort Schuyler, built by American colonists for defense in 1758 during the French and Indian War, the North American front of the Seven Years' War against France. Prior to construction of the fort, the Mohawk, Onondaga and Oneida nations had controlled this area southeast of the Great Lakes region as early as 4000 BC. The Mohawk were the largest and most powerful nation in the eastern and lower Mohawk Valley. Colonists had a long-standing fur trade with the Mohawk, in exchange for firearms and rum. The Iroquois nations' dominating presence in the region prevented the Province of New York from expanding past the middle of the Mohawk Valley until after the American victory in the Revolutionary War. Following the war several Iroquois nations were forced to cede lands to New York: British allies due to defeat and American allies in exchange for post-war shelter and supplies which were necessary following the brutal fighting.

The land housing Old Fort Schuyler was part of a  portion of marshland granted by King George II to New York governor William Cosby on January 2, 1734. Since the fort was located near several trails (including the Great Indian Warpath), its position—on a bend at a shallow portion of the Mohawk River—made it an important fording point. The Mohawk call the bend Unundadages ("around the hill"), a name that now appears on the city's seal.

During the American Revolutionary War, border raids from British-allied Iroquois tribes harried the settlers on the frontier. George Washington ordered Sullivan's Expedition, Rangers, to enter Central New York and suppress the Iroquois threat. More than 40 Iroquois villages were destroyed along with their winter stores, causing starvation. In the aftermath of the war, numerous colonial settlers migrated into the region of New York from New England, especially Connecticut.

In 1794 a state road, Genesee Road, was built from Utica west to the Genesee River. That year a contract was awarded to the Mohawk Turnpike and Bridge Company to extend the road northeast to Albany, and in 1798 it was extended. The Seneca Turnpike was key to Utica's development, replacing a worn footpath with a paved road. The village became a rest and supply area along the Mohawk River for goods and the many people moving through Western New York to and from the Great Lakes.

The boundaries of the village of Utica were defined in an act passed by the New York State Legislature on April 3, 1798. Utica expanded its borders in subsequent 1805 and 1817 charters. On April 5, 1805, the village's eastern and western boundaries were expanded, and on April 7, 1817, Utica separated from Whitestown on its west. After completion of the Erie Canal in 1825, the city's growth was stimulated again.

The municipal charter was passed by the state legislature on February 13, 1832. In 1845 the United States Census ranked Utica as the 29th-largest in the country (with 20,000 residents, more than the populations of Chicago, Detroit or Cleveland.)

Industry and trade 

Utica's location on the Erie and Chenango canals encouraged industrial development, allowing the transport of anthracite coal from northeastern Pennsylvania for local manufacturing and distribution. Utica's economy centered around the manufacture of furniture, heavy machinery, textiles and lumber. The combined effects of the Embargo Act of 1807 and local investment enabled further expansion of the textile industry.

In addition to the canals, transport in Utica was bolstered by railroads running through the city. The first was the Mohawk and Hudson Rail Road, which became the Utica and Schenectady Railroad in 1833. Its  connection between Schenectady and Utica was developed in 1836 from the right-of-way previously used by the Mohawk and Hudson River railway. Later lines, such as the Syracuse and Utica Railroad, merged with the Utica and Schenectady to form the New York Central Railroad, which originated as a 19th-century forest railway of the Adirondacks.

In the early 1800s, William Williams, and his partner published Utica's first newspaper, The Utica Club, from their printing shop on Genesee Street. In 1817 Williams also published Utica's first directory.

Abolitionism 
During the 1850s, Utica aided more than 650 fugitive slaves; it played a major role as a station in the Underground Railroad. The city was on a slave escape route from the Southern Tier to Canada by way of Albany, Syracuse, or Rochester. The route, used by Harriet Tubman to travel to Buffalo, guided slaves to pass through Utica on the New York Central Railroad right-of-way en route to Canada. Utica was the locus for Methodist preacher Orange Scott's antislavery sermons during the 1830s and 1840s, and Scott formed an abolitionist group there in 1843. Beriah Green organized the 1835 initial meeting of the New York Anti-Slavery Society in Utica, which was disrupted by an anti-abolitionist mob led by local congressman Samuel Beardsley and other "prominent citizens". (It adjourned to Gerrit Smith's home in nearby Peterboro, New York.)

20th century to present

The early 20th century brought rail advances to Utica, with the New York Central electrifying  of track from the city to Syracuse in 1907 for its West Shore interurban line. In 1902, the Utica and Mohawk Valley Railway connected Rome to Little Falls with a  electrified line through Utica.

In 1919, two-thirds of employed Uticans worked in the textile industry. The textile industry in the Northern United States declined rapidly following World War I, as mills relocated to the Southern United States. Textiles remained the leading industry in Utica through 1947, employing a little less than a quarter of workers. Through the 1940s and 1950s, local politicians lobbied for modern industry to come to Utica, and General Electric, Chicago Pneumatic, Bendix Aviation, and Univac among others established factories in Utica. Utica College and Mohawk Valley Community College were founded to provide skilled workers, and Oneida County Airport was built to provide transport. The city also underwent a residential expansion and modernization. This time period is sometimes called the called the "loom to boom" era.

By the 1950s, Utica was known as "Sin City" because of the extent of its corruption at the hands of the Democratic Party political machine. During the late 1920s, trucker Rufus Elefante rose to power although he never ran for office. Originally a Republican, Elefante's power was enhanced by support from New York governor Franklin D. Roosevelt. Utica newspapers the Observer-Dispatch and Utica Daily Press were awarded the 1959 Pulitzer Prize for Public Service for their investigations of local corruption. Organized crime in Utica peaked in the 1950s, with a resurgence in the late 1970s. The indictment of local associates of the Buffalo crime family in 1989 is regarded as the end of the Mafia in Utica.

Waves of Italian, Irish, Polish and Lebanese Maronite immigrants worked in the city's industries in the early part of the 20th century. Strongly affected by the deindustrialization that took place in other Rust Belt cities, Utica suffered a major reduction in manufacturing activity during the second half of the 20th century. The remaining textile mills continued to be undercut by competitors in the South. The 1954 opening of the New York State Thruway (which bypassed the city) and declines in activity on the Erie Canal and railroads throughout the United States also contributed to a poor local economy. During the 1980s and 1990s, major employers such as General Electric and Lockheed Martin closed plants in Utica and Syracuse.

City jobs were moved to the towns and villages around Utica during the suburbanization of the postwar period. This led to the expansion of the nearby town of New Hartford and the village of Whitesboro. Utica's lack of quality academic and educational choices, when compared to Syracuse, under an hour away, contributed to its decline in local businesses and jobs as some economic activity moved to Syracuse during the 1990s. Utica's population fell while population in the county increased, reflecting a statewide trend of decreasing urban populations outside New York City. Residents who remain in the city struggle to handle poverty issues stemming from social and economic conditions caused partially by a smaller tax base; this adversely affects schools and public services. Despite the city's economic decline, it has benefited from a low cost of living, attracting immigrants and refugees from around the world. Utica became home to Bosnians following the Bosnian War, Burmese Buddhist monks after the Saffron Revolution, and Afghans after the Fall of Kabul.

In 2010, Utica, the focus of local, regional and statewide economic-revitalization efforts, developed its first comprehensive master plan in more than a half-century.

Geography

According to the United States Census Bureau, Utica has a total area of — of land and  (1.52 percent) of water. The city is located at New York's geographic center, adjacent to the western border of Herkimer County, and at the southwestern base of the Adirondack Mountains.

Topography

The city's Mohawk name, Unundadages ("around the hill") refers to a bend in the Mohawk River that flows around the city's elevated position as seen from the Deerfield Hills in the north. The Erie Canal and Mohawk River pass through northern Utica; northwest of downtown is the Utica Marsh, a group of cattail wetlands between the Erie Canal and Mohawk River (partially in the town of Marcy) with a variety of animals, plants and birds. During the 1850s, plank roads were built through the marshland surrounding the city. Utica's suburbs have more hills and cliffs than the city. Located where the Mohawk Valley forms a wide floodplain, the city has a generally sloping, flat topography.

Cityscape

Utica's architecture features many styles that are also visible in comparable areas of Buffalo, Rochester and Syracuse, including Greek Revival, Italianate, French Renaissance, Gothic Revival and Neoclassical.

Streets laid out when Utica was a village had more irregularities than those built later in the 19th and 20th centuries. As a result of the city's location (adjacent to the Mohawk River), many streets parallel the river, so they do not run strictly east–west or north–south. Remnants of Utica's early electric-rail systems can be seen in the West and South neighborhoods, where the rails were set into the streets.

Neighborhoods

Utica's neighborhoods have historically been defined by their residents, allowing them to develop their own individuality. Racial and ethnic groups, social and economic separation and the development of infrastructure and new means of transportation have shaped neighborhoods, with groups shifting between them as a result.

West Utica (or the West Side) was historically home to German, Irish and Polish immigrants. The Corn Hill neighborhood in the city center had a significant Jewish population. East Utica (or the East Side) is a cultural and political center dominated by Italian immigrants. North of downtown is the Triangle neighborhood, formerly home to the city's African American and Jewish populations. Neighborhoods formerly dominated by one or more groups saw other groups arrive, such as Bosnians and Latin Americans in former Italian neighborhoods and the historically Welsh neighborhood of Corn Hill. Bagg Commemorative Park and Bagg's Square West (Utica's historic centers) are in the northeastern portion of downtown, with Genesee Street on the west and Oriskany Street on the south.

Historic places
The following are listed on the National Register of Historic Places:

Alexander Pirnie Federal Building
Byington Mill (Frisbie & Stansfield Knitting Company)
Calvary Episcopal Church
Roscoe Conkling House
Doyle Hardware Building
First Baptist Church of Deerfield
First Presbyterian Church
Fort Schuyler Club Building
Globe Woolen Company Mills
Grace Church
John C. Hieber Building
Hurd & Fitzgerald Building
Lower Genesee Street Historic District
Memorial Church of the Holy Cross
Millar-Wheeler House
Munson-Williams-Proctor Arts Institute
New Century Club
Rutger-Steuben Park Historic District
St. Joseph's Church
Stanley Theater
Tabernacle Baptist Church
Union Station
Uptown Theatre
Utica Armory
Utica Daily Press Building
Utica Parks and Parkway Historic District
Utica Public Library
Utica State Hospital
Gen. John G. Weaver House
Forest Hill Cemetery

Climate
Utica has a humid continental climate (or warm-summer climate: Köppen Dfb) with four distinct seasons, characterized by cold winters and temperate summers.

Winters are cold and snowy; Utica receives lake-effect snow from Lake Erie and Lake Ontario. Utica is colder on average than other Great Lakes cities because of its location in a valley and susceptibility to north winds; temperatures in the single digits or below zero Fahrenheit are not uncommon on winter nights.

Demographics

The city's growth during the 19th century is indicated by the increase in its population; in 1845 the United States Census ranked Utica as the 29th-largest in the country, with 20,000 residents, more than the populations of Chicago, Detroit or Cleveland.

, the city is the tenth-most populous in New York and the sixth-most populous metro region in New York. It is the seat of Oneida County, and a focal point of the six-county Mohawk Valley region. According to a U.S. Census estimate, the Utica–Rome Metropolitan Statistical Area decreased in population from 299,397 in 2010 to 296,615 on July 1, 2014, and its population density was about 3,818 people per square mile (1,474/km2).

Utica's population has remained ethnically diverse and has received many new influxes of immigrants since the 1990s. New immigrants and refugees have included Bosnians displaced by the Bosnian War, Burmese, Karens, Latinos, Russians, and Vietnamese. More than 42 languages are spoken in the city. Utica's population halted a forty-year decline in 2010, influenced by this influx of refugees and immigrants.

In the 2020 United States Census, Utica's population was 65,283. According to the 2013 American Community Survey, the Italian American population has declined since its peak by more than 40%. Italian Americans however remain the most prominent ethnic group, constituting 20% of the city population. Utica is historically one of the most Italian cities in the country. Throughout the 20th century, the city had a higher concentration of Italian immigrants than other cities with notable levels of Italian immigration, such as New York City, Chicago, and Philadelphia. Italian immigrants from Basilicata were first to arrive, but most later immigrants came from the regions of Apulia, Lazio, Calabria, and Abruzzo, with an unusually large number from the village of Alberobello in Apulia. A smaller number came from Sicily than is typical for most Italian-American communities.

The remainder of sizable ethnic groups include, as approximations: Slavs (18%) broken down as Poles (8.3%), Bosnians (7%) and Eastern Slavs at a combined (2.7%). Irish (11.3%), African Americans (10.5%), German (10.3%), ethnically English or American residents (8%), Puerto Ricans (6.8%). Burmese (3.5%), French and French-Canadians (2.7%), Arabs and Lebanese (2%), (non-Hispanic) Caribbean West Indies (1.8%), Dominicans (1.5%), Vietnamese (1.5%) and Cambodians (.7%). Iroquois or other (non-Hispanic) Amerindians (.3%).

Median income per Utica household was $30,818. Per capita income was $17,653, and 29.6% of the population were below the poverty threshold.

Economy
During the mid-19th century, Utica's canals and railroads supported industries producing furniture, locomotive headlights, steam gauges, firearms, textiles and lumber. World War I sparked the growth of Savage Arms, which produced the Lewis gun for the British Army, and the city prospered as one of the wealthiest per capita in the United States.

In the early 20th century, the local textile industry began to decline, which had a significant impact on the local economy. The boll weevil adversely affected southern cotton crops in this period. During the late 1940s, air-conditioned mills opened in the southern United States, and jobs were lost as factories were moved south, where labor costs were lower because "right to work" laws weakened unions. Other industries also moved out of the city during a general restructuring in older industrial cities. New industries to rise in the city were electronics manufacturing (led by companies such as General Electric, which produced transistor radios), machinery and equipment, and food processing.

The city struggled to make a transition to new industries. During the second half of the 20th century, the city's recessions were longer than the national average. The exodus of defense companies (such as Lockheed Martin, formed from the merger of the Lockheed Corporation and Martin Marietta in 1995) and the electrical-manufacturing industry played a major role in Utica's recent economic distress. From 1975 to 2001, the city's economic growth rate was similar to that of Buffalo, while other upstate New York cities such as Rochester and Binghamton outperformed both.

In the early 21st century, the Mohawk Valley economy is based on logistics, industrial processes, machinery, and industrial services. In Rome, the former Griffiss Air Force Base has remained a regional employer as a technology center. The Turning Stone Resort & Casino in Verona is a tourist destination, with a number of expansions during the 1990s and 2000s.

Utica's larger employers include the ConMed Corporation (a surgical-device and orthotics manufacturer) and Faxton St. Luke's Healthcare, the city's primary health care system.

Construction, such as the North-South Arterial Highway project, supports the public-sector job market. Although passenger and commercial traffic on the Erie Canal has declined greatly since the 19th century, the barge canal still allows heavy cargo to travel through Utica at low cost, bypassing the New York State Thruway and providing intermodal freight transport with the railroads.

Law, government, and politics

Democrat Robert M. Palmieri, elected in 2011, is Utica's current mayor.
The common council consists of 10 members, six of whom are elected from single-member districts. The other four, including its president, are elected at-large. Utica has a Strong mayor-council form of government. The council has eight standing committees for issues including transportation, education, finance and public safety. There is a relative balance between the Democratic and Republican parties, a change from the predominantly single-party politics of the 20th century. Throughout the 1950s, Democrats held the mayor's office and a majority on the city council.

Utica is in New York's 22nd congressional district, which has been represented by Republican Claudia Tenney since 2021. The city is served by the United States District Court for the Northern District of New York, with offices in the Alexander Pirnie Federal Building.

According to the comptroller's office, Utica's governmental expenses totaled $79.3 million in 2014 (a net increase of $940,000 from the previous year). The 2015–16 budget proposes general-fund spending of $66.3 million. City taxes collected in 2014 were $25,972,930, with a tax rate per thousand of $25.24.

According to the city's police department, there were six murders, 125 robberies, 22 rapes, and 237 assaults in 2014 (an increase from the previous year, representing a violent-crime rate of 0.6 percent). There were 432 burglaries, 1,845 larcenies and 107 motor-vehicle thefts (a decrease from 2013, representing a property-crime rate of 3.8 percent). Compared to other cities in New York, Utica's crime rate is generally low. The Utica Police Department patrols the city, and law enforcement is also under the jurisdiction of the Oneida County Sheriff's Office and the New York State Police. The Utica Fire Department coordinates four engines, two truck companies, and rescue, HAZMAT and medical operations with a 123-person crew.

Culture

Utica's position in the northeastern United States has allowed the blending of cultures and traditions. It shares characteristics with other cities in Central New York including its dialect group (Inland Northern American English, which is also present in other Rust Belt cities such as Buffalo, Elmira and Erie, Pennsylvania).

Utica shares a cuisine with the mid-Atlantic states, with local and regional influences. Its melting pot of immigrant and refugee cuisines, including Dutch, Italian, German, Irish and Bosnian, have introduced dishes such as ćevapi and pasticciotti to the community. Utica staple foods include chicken riggies, Utica greens, half-moons, mushroom stew, and tomato pie. Other popular dishes are pierogi, penne alla vodka, and sausage and peppers.
Utica has long had ties to the brewing industry. The family-owned Matt Brewing Company (Saranac Brewery) resisted the bankruptcies and plant closings that came with the industry consolidation under a few national brands. As of 2012, it was ranked the 15th-largest brewery by sales in the United States. The Brewers Association named the brewery among America's top 35 craft breweries in 2019.

The annual  Boilermaker Road Race, organized by the city in conjunction with the National Distance Running Hall of Fame, attracts runners from the region and around the world, including Kenya and Romania. The Children's Museum of Natural History, Science and Technology, next to Union Station, opened in 1963. In 2002, the museum partnered with NASA to feature space-related exhibits and events. The Munson-Williams-Proctor Arts Institute, founded in 1919, features a PrattMWP program in cooperation with the Pratt Institute, and permanent collections and rotating exhibits.

The Utica Psychiatric Center is in a Greek Revival structure, the site of a former insane asylum that was the birthplace of the Utica crib, a restraining device frequently used at the asylum from the mid-19th century to 1887. The Stanley Center for the Arts, a mid-sized concert and performance venue, was designed by Thomas W. Lamb in 1928 and today features theatrical and musical performances by local and touring groups. The Hotel Utica, designed by Esenwein & Johnson in 1912, became a nursing and residential-care facility during the 1970s. Notable guests had included Franklin D. Roosevelt, Judy Garland and Bobby Darin. It was restored as a hotel in 2001.

Parks and recreation

Frederick Law Olmsted, Jr., who designed New York City's Central Park and Delaware Park in Buffalo, designed the Utica Parks and Parkway Historic District. Olmsted also designed Memorial Parkway, a  tree-lined boulevard connecting the district's parks and encircling the city's southern neighborhoods. The district includes Roscoe Conkling Park, the 62-acre F.T. Proctor Park, the Parkway, and T.R. Proctor Park.

The city's municipal golf course, Valley View (designed by golf-course architect Robert Trent Jones), is in the southern part of the city near the town of New Hartford. The Utica Zoo and the Val Bialas Ski Chalet, an urban ski slope featuring skiing, snowboarding, outdoor skating, and tubing, are also in south Utica in Roscoe Conkling Park. Smaller neighborhood parks in the district include Addison Miller Park, Chancellor Park, Seymour Park, and Wankel Park.

The Utica Canal Terminal Harbor is connected to the Erie Canal and Mohawk River.

Infrastructure

Transportation

Griffiss International Airport in Rome primarily serves military and general aviation, and Syracuse Hancock International Airport and Albany International Airport provide regional, domestic, and international passenger air travel in the Utica–Rome Metropolitan Area. Amtrak's Empire (two unnamed trains), Maple Leaf, and Lake Shore Limited trains stop at Utica's Union Station. Bus service is provided by the Central New York Regional Transportation Authority (CENTRO), a Syracuse public transport operator which runs 12 lines in Utica and has a downtown hub. Intercity bus service is provided by Greyhound Lines, Short Line, Adirondack Trailways, and Birnie Bus Service, with weekday and Saturday service to Syracuse; both stop at Union Station.

During the 1960s and 1970s, New York state planners envisioned a system of arterial roads in Utica that would include connections to Binghamton and Interstate 81. Due to community opposition, only parts of the highway project were completed, including the North–South Arterial Highway running through the city. Six New York State highways, one three-digit interstate highway, and one two-digit interstate highway pass through Utica. New York State Route 49 and State Route 840 are east–west expressways running along Utica's northern and southern borders, respectively, and the eastern terminus of each is in the city. New York State Route 5 and its alternate routes—State Route 5S and State Route 5A—are east–west roads and expressways that pass through Utica. The western terminus of Route 5S and the eastern terminus of Route 5A are both in the city. With Route 5 and Interstate 790 (an auxiliary highway of Interstate 90), New York State Route 12 and State Route 8 form the North–South Arterial Highway.

Utilities
Electricity in Utica is provided by National Grid plc, a British energy corporation that acquired the city's former electricity provider, Niagara Mohawk, in 2002. Utica is near the crossroads of major electrical transmission lines, with substations in the town of Marcy. An expansion project by the New York Power Authority, National Grid, Consolidated Edison, and New York State Electric and Gas (NYSEG) is planned. In 2009 city businesses (including Utica College and St. Luke's Medical Center) developed a microgrid, and in 2012 the Utica City Council explored the possibility of a public, city-owned power company. Utica's natural gas is provided by National Grid and NYSEG.

Municipal solid waste is collected and disposed of weekly by the Oneida-Herkimer Solid Waste Authority, a public-benefit corporation that coordinates single-stream recycling, waste reduction, composting, and the disposal of hazardous materials and demolition debris. Utica's wastewater is treated by the Mohawk Valley Water Authority, with a capacity of 32 million gallons per day. Treated water is tested for impurities including pathogens, nitrates, and nitrites.

Health care
Primary health care in Utica is provided by the Mohawk Valley Health System, a nonprofit organization that operates Faxton St. Luke's Healthcare and St. Elizabeth Medical Center. Faxton and St. Luke's are surgical centers, and St. Elizabeth is a trauma and surgical center. The Faxton and St. Luke's hospitals have a total of 370 acute and 202 long-term beds, and St. Elizabeth Medical Center has 201 acute-care beds. The Mohawk Valley Health System is currently building the Wynn Hospital in downtown Utica to consolidate many operations at the existing hospital campuses, and is expected to open in October 2023.

Education

Like Ithaca and Syracuse, Utica has a mix of public and private colleges and universities; three state colleges and four private colleges are in the Utica–Rome metropolitan area. SUNY Polytechnic Institute, on an 850-acre campus in North Utica and Marcy, has over 2,000 students and is one of 14 doctorate-granting universities of the State University of New York (SUNY). Mohawk Valley Community College is the largest college between Syracuse and Albany with nearly 7,000 students, and an Empire State College location serves Utica and Rome.

Formerly a satellite campus of Syracuse University, Utica University (Utica College before 2022) is a four-year private liberal arts college with over 3,000 students. Established in 1904, St. Elizabeth College of Nursing partners with regional institutions to grant nursing degrees. Pratt Institute offers a local two-year fine-arts course. The Utica School of Commerce, a for-profit business college, closed at the end of 2016.

The Utica City School District had an enrollment of nearly 10,000 in 2012 and is the most racially diverse school district in Upstate New York. District schools include Thomas R. Proctor High School, James H. Donovan Middle School, John F Kennedy middle school and ten elementary schools. Utica's original public high school, the Utica Free Academy, closed in 1987. The city is also home to Notre Dame Junior Senior High School, a small Catholic high school founded in 1959 by the Xaverian Brothers.

Sports

Utica is home to the Utica Comets of the American Hockey League (AHL), a team affiliated with the National Hockey League's New Jersey Devils. The team was established in Utica for the 2013–14 season when the Vancouver Canucks relocated their AHL franchise. The 3,815-seat Adirondack Bank Center, which opened in 1960, as the Utica Memorial Auditorium, is home to the Comets and the Utica University Pioneers. The Utica Devils played in the AHL from 1987 to 1993, and the Utica Bulldogs (1993–94), Utica Blizzard (1994–1997), and Mohawk Valley Prowlers (1998–2001) were members of the United Hockey League (UHL).

Since 2018, the city is also home to Utica City FC, a professional indoor soccer team playing in the Major Arena Soccer League.

The city was home to the Utica Blue Sox (1939–2001), a New York–Penn League baseball team also affiliated with the Toronto Blue Jays and, later, the Miami Marlins. Other former baseball teams included the Utica Asylums (1900) and the Boston Braves-affiliated Utica Braves (1939–42). Since 2008, the city has been home to a collegiate summer baseball team also called the Blue Sox.

Area collegiate teams

Media

Utica is served by three stations affiliated with major television networks: WKTV 2 (NBC; CBS on DT2; CW on DT3), WUTR 20 (ABC), and WFXV 33 (Fox). PBS member station WCNY-TV in Syracuse operates translator W22DO-D on analog channel 22 and digital channel 24. Several low-power television stations, such as WPNY-LD 11 (MyNetworkTV), also broadcast in the area. Cable television viewers are served by the Syracuse office of Charter Communications (doing business as Charter Spectrum), which offers a local news service and public-access channels. Dish Network and DirecTV provide satellite television customers with local broadcast channels.

Utica's main daily newspaper is the Observer-Dispatch; the Utica Phoenix, established in 2002, is an alternative. The city has 26 FM radio stations and nine AM stations. Major station owners in the area include Townsquare Media and Galaxy Communications. In addition to minor popular-culture references, Slap Shot (1977) was partially filmed in Utica, and the city has been featured on the TV series The Office.

The Mid York Library System serves Utica and is chartered by the Board of Regents of the University of the State of New York. The library system has 43 branches (including the Utica Public Library) in Oneida, Herkimer and Madison counties.

Notable people

See also

Lower Genesee Street Historic District
Utica Shale – a geological formation named for Utica
Timeline of town creation in Central New York

Notes and references

Notes

References

Bibliography

Further reading

External links

NYPL Digital Gallery, Items related to Utica, NY
Library of Congress, Prints & Photos Division, Items related to Utica, NY
SkyscraperPage, Diagram of skyscrapers in Utica, NY

 
Cities in New York (state)
County seats in New York (state)
Cities in Oneida County, New York
Populated places on the Mohawk River
1798 establishments in New York (state)
Populated places established in 1798
Populated places on the Underground Railroad